The Celje First Grammar School is a coeducational nondenominational state secondary general education school for students aged between 15 and 19 in Celje, Slovenia. It was the first high school built in the region, established in 1808 by the Austrian Empire. Initially, the language of instruction was only German, although the great majority of the pupils came from the Slovene Lands. In 1895, the first classes with Slovene as the language of instruction were established. German nationalists in Austria-Hungary fiercely opposed this move, which resulted in a government crisis and fall of the cabinet of prince Alfred III. zu Windisch-Grätz. After the end of World War I and the formation of the State of Slovenes, Croats and Serbs (later Kingdom of Yugoslavia), the high school switched to Slovene as the language of instruction. During its 200-year history, many of its pupils have become prominent individuals.

Prominent alumni
Anton Aškerc (1856–1912), poet
Anton Bezenšek (1854–1915), shorthand expert and author
Ljerka Bizilj (b. 1953), TV host
Franjo Bobinac (b. 1958), manager
Matej Bor (1913–1993), poet
Marija Boršnik (1906–1982), literary historian
Janez Cvirn (b. 1960), historian
Gregor Čremošnik (1890–1958), historian
Karel Destovnik Kajuh (1922–1944), poet
Anžej Dežan (b. 1987), singer
Julius Glowacki (1846–1915), natural scientist
Igor Grdina (b. 1965), historian
Benjamin Ipavec (1829–1909), physician and composer
Romana Jordan Cizelj (b. 1966), physicist and politician, Member of the European Parliament
Matjaž Kmecl (b. 1934), literary historian and critic
Marianne Elisabeth Lloyd-Dolbey (1919–1994), personal secretary to the Sultan of Brunei Omar Ali Saifuddien III
Franjo Malgaj (1894–1919), military hero
Miloš Mikeln (1930–2014), author
Anton Novačan (1887–1951), author, diplomat and politician
Franc Ksaver Meško (1874–1864), author
Aleš Pipan (b. 1959), basketball coach
Maks Pleteršnik (1840–1923), linguist and philologian
Bojan Prašnikar (b. 1953), football coach
Tanja Ribič (b. 1968), actress and singer
Jurij Sadar (b. 1962), architect
Zmago Sagadin (b. 1952), basketball coach
Lavoslav Schwentner (1865–1952), editor
Mojmir Sepe (1930–2020), composer, conductor, arranger, trumpeter    
Blessed Anton Martin Slomšek (1800–1862), Roman Catholic bishop
Katarina Srebotnik (b. 1981), tennis player
Bojan Šrot (b. 1959), politician
Beno Udrih (b. 1982), basketball player
Bogumil Vošnjak (1882–1955), jurist, politician, diplomat, historian
Josip Vošnjak (1834–1911), politician, physician and author
Anton Aloys Wolf (1802–1871),  Roman Catholic bishop of Ljubljana, lexicographer
 Marko Šuštaršič (1927–1976), painter

External links
www.prvagim.si (page in Slovene)

Sources 
 Article on Encyclopædia Britannica, referring to the 1895 Government Crisis

First Grammar School
Secondary schools in Slovenia